The Roman Catholic Diocese of Crete  is a diocese located on the island of Crete in the Ecclesiastical province of Naxos, Andros, Tinos and Mykonos in Greece.

History
Roman Catholic presence on the island of Crete dates to its conquest by the Republic of Venice in the years after the Fourth Crusade (1204), and its establishment as a Venetian colony in 1212. Immediately after that, the first Latin Rite Archbishop of Crete was appointed, with a succession of holders until the Ottoman conquest of the island in the Cretan War (1645–69). Thereafter the see remained vacant, until re-established as a simple bishopric on 28 August 1874, initially a suffragan of the Roman Catholic Archdiocese of Izmir, but today a suffragan of the Roman Catholic Archdiocese of Naxos, Andros, Tinos and Mykonos.

Present day Catholic Churches in Heraklion (Saint John The Baptist), Chania, Rethymnon (St. Antony on Padua)

Leadership

Venetian period
 anonymous (1213 – ?), took part in the Fifth Crusade in 1220
 Giovanni Querini (? – 17 July 1252, named bishop of Ferrara with the personal rank of archbishop)
 Angelo Maltraverso, OP (1252 – 28 May 1255, named patriarch of Grado)
 Leonardo Pantaleo (1260 – 1268)
 anonymous (mentioned 10 May 1282)
 Matteo, OP (31 January 1289 – ?)
 Angelo Beacqua (7 April 1294 – ?, deceased)
 See united with the Latin Patriarchate of Constantinople (1302–1314)
 Alessandro di Sant'Elpidio, OESA (2 March 1314 – 1334, dismissed)
 Egidio di Gallutiis, OP (11 May 1334 – 6 December 1340, deceased)
 Francesco Michiel (before 25 September 1342 – ?, named bishop of Patara with the personal rank of archbishop)
 Orso Dolfin (30 March 1349 – 5 November 1361, named patriarch of Grado)
 Orso Dolfin (5 November 1361 – 1363), apostolic administrator
 Pietro Tommaso, OCarm (6 March 1363 – 5 July 1364, named patriarch of Constantinople)
 Francesco Querini (5 July 1364 – 22 December 1367, named patriarch of Grado)
 Antonio Negri (15 January 1369 – ?)
 Pietro (April 1375 – ?)
 Matteo (19 March 1378 – ?)
 Cristoforo Gallina ?
 Antonio Contarini (6 April 1386 – 16 March 1387, deceased)
 Leonardo Dolfin (7 May 1387 – 29 April 1392, named bishop of Castello with the personal rank of archbishop)
 Marco Giustiniani (31 August 1392 – 1405, deceased)
 Francesco Pavoni (13 February 1406 – 1407?, deceased)
 Marco Marin (18 October 1407 – ?, deceased)
 Leonardo Dolfin (14 September 1408 – 1415, deceased)
 Pietro Donà (18 April 1415 – 1425, named bishop of Castello with the personal rank of archbishop)
 Fantino Valaresso (5 December 1425 – 18 May 1443, deceased)
 Fantino Dandolo (4 September 1444 – 8 January 1448, named bishop of Padua with the personal rank of archbishop)
 Filippo Paruta (arcivescovo)|Filippo Paruta (20 February 1448 – 1458, deceased)
 Gerolamo Lando (29 March 1458 – 1493/1494, dismissed)
 Andrea Lando (4 July 1494 – 1505, deceased)
 Giovanni Lando (2 March 1506 – 1534 ?)
 Lorenzo Campeggi (17 June 1534 – 1535), apostolic administrator
 Pietro Lando (28 January 1536 – 1575, dismissed)
 Lorenzo Vitturi (6 February 1576 – 5 February 1597, deceased)
 Tommaso Contarini (4 July 1597 – 7 February 1604, deceased)
 Aloisio Grimani (7 January 1605 – 21 February 1620, deceased)
 Pietro Valier (18 May 1620 – 2 October 1623, named bishop of Ceneda with the personal rank of archbishop)
 Luca Stella (4 December 1623 – 24 November 1632, named bishop of Vicenza with the personal rank of archbishop)
 Leonardo Mocenigo (20 June 1633 – 1644, deceased)
 Giovanni Querini (19 November 1644 – ?, deceased)

See vacant from 1669.

Modern period
 Bishop Petros Stefanou, (Apostolic Administrator); 
 Bishop Frangiskos Papamanolis, O.F.M. Cap. (Apostolic Administrator 1974.06.27 – 2014.05.13)
 Bishop Georges Xenopulos, S.J. (Apostolic Administrator 1952 – 1974)
 Fr. Arsenio da Corfù, O.F.M. Cap. (Apostolic Administrator 1951 – 1952)
 Fr. Amedeo Marcantonio Speciale da Gangi, O.F.M. Cap. (Apostolic Administrator 1945? – 1951)
 Fr. Roberto da Gangi, O.F.M. Cap. (Apostolic Administrator 1939 – 1945?)
 Bishop Lorenzo Giacomo Inglese, O.F.M. Cap. (1934.02.01 – 1935.05.05)
 Fr. Isidoro da Smirne, O.F.M. Cap. (Apostolic Administrator 1926 – 1933?)
 Bishop Francesco Giuseppe Seminara, O.F.M. Cap. (1910.06.22 – 1926.03.15)
 Bishop Luigi Canavo, O.F.M. Cap. (1874.12.22 – 1889.05.10)

See also
Roman Catholicism in Greece

References

Sources
 GCatholic.org
 Catholic Hierarchy
 Diocese website
 Crete Parishes Website

Roman Catholic dioceses in Greece
Religious organizations established in the 1210s
Catholicism in Crete
Roman Catholic dioceses established in the 13th century